Streetheart may refer to:

Streetheart / Le cœur au poing, a 1998 film
Streetheart (band), a Canadian rock band
Streetheart (Dion album), an album